Taha Abdul Karim (born 11 December 1939) is an Iraqi boxer. He competed in the 1960 Summer Olympics.

References

1939 births
Living people
Boxers at the 1960 Summer Olympics
Iraqi male boxers
Olympic boxers of Iraq
Sportspeople from Baghdad
Lightweight boxers